Pseudacanthocera is a genus of horse flies in the family Tabanidae.

Species
Pseudacanthocera brevicorne Enderlein, 1925
Pseudacanthocera fraterna Kröber, 1930
Pseudacanthocera paralellifrons Kröber, 1929
Pseudacanthocera sylveirii (Macquart, 1838)

References

Tabanidae
Diptera of South America
Taxa named by Adolfo Lutz
Brachycera genera